Hunedoara County is a county (județ) of Romania, in Transylvania, with its capital city at Deva. The county is part of the Danube–Criș–Mureș–Tisa Euroregion.

Name
The county got its name from the city of Hunedoara, which is the Romanian transliteration of the Hungarian , old name of the municipality. That most likely originated from the Hungarian  verb meaning 'to close' or 'to die', but may also come from wear the name of the Huns, who were headquartered near for a time and were the first to establish solid rule over the land since the Dacians.

Demographics 
In 2021, the county had a population of 361,657. The population of Hunedoara county is the second eldest of all Romanian counties, with an average age of the residents of 45.5 years, only behind Teleorman County (46.3 years).

In 2011, the county had a population of 396,253 and the population density was 56.1/km2.

 Romanians - 93.31%
 Hungarians - 4.09%
 Romani - 1.9%
 Germans (Transylvanian Saxons) - 0.25%

Hunedoara's Jiu River Valley is traditionally a coal-mining region, and its high level of industrialisation drew many people from other regions of Romania in the period before the fall of the communist regime.

Geography

This county has a total area of 7,063 km2.

Mainly, the relief is made up of mountains, divided by the Mureș River valley which crosses the county from East to West. To the North side there are the Apuseni Mountains and to the South side there are mountains from the Southern Carpathians group, Parâng Mountains group and Retezat-Godeanu Mountains group: Orastie and Surianu Mountains (South-East), Retezat Mountains (South), Poiana Ruscai Mountains (South-West).

Except from the Mureș River with its tributaries Strei, Râul Mare and Cerna which forms wide valleys, in the North side Crișul Alb River also forms a valley in the Apuseni Mountains - Zarand region. In the South side along the Jiu River with its two branches Jiul de Vest and Jiul de Est, there is a large depression, and an accessible route towards Southern Romania - Oltenia..

Neighbours

 Alba County in the East and North.
 Arad County, Timiș County and Caraș-Severin County in the West.
 Gorj County in the South.

Economy
Hunedoara County was one of the most industrialised areas during the communist period, and was very negatively affected when the industry collapsed after the fall of the communist regime.

The industry in the Hunedoara county is linked with the mining activity in the region. In the mountains, from ancient times, metals and coal have been exploited. Nowadays, there is one large industrial complex at Hunedoara owned by Mittal Steel. Also energy related enterprises are located in the county - one of the biggest thermoelectric plant is located at Mintia.

The Jiu Valley, located in the south of the country, has been a major mining area throughout the second half of the 19th century and the 20th century, but many mines were closed down in the years following the collapse of the communist regime.

The city of Hunedoara has also suffered significantly from the 1990s onwards - under communism it
contained the largest steel works in Romania (until Galați took the lead), but activity gradually diminished after the fall of communism due to the loss of the market. This was a blow to the overall prosperity of the town, which is now recovering through new investments.

Agricultural activities also take place in Hunedoara county, which include livestock raising, and fruit and cereal cultivation. The county also has touristic potential, especially through the Dacian Fortresses of the Orăștie Mountains and the Corvin Castle.

The predominant industries in the county are:
 Metallurgy.
 Construction materials.
 Textile industry.
 Mining equipment.
 Food industry.

In the 1990s, a large amount of mines were closed down, leaving Hunedoara county with the highest unemployment rate in Romania, of 9.6%, in comparison to the national average of 5.5%.

Tourism

Retezat National Park and other picturesque regions makes it one of the most beautiful counties in Romania. Also there can be found Dacian and Roman complexes in the Orăştie Mountains.

The main tourist attractions in the county are:
 The Dacian Fortresses of the Orăștie Mountains - nowadays part of UNESCO World Heritage.
 Colonia Augusta Ulpia Traiana Dacica Sarmizegetusa - the capital of the Roman province of Dacia.
 The medieval edifices of Densuș, Deva, Hunedoara, Santămaria-Orlea, Strei.
 The Medieval Castle from Hunedoara
 The Medieval Guard Tower from Crivadia

Politics 

The Hunedoara County Council, renewed at the 2020 local elections, consists of 32 counsellors, with the following party composition:

Administrative divisions

Hunedoara County has 7 municipalities, 7 towns and 55 communes. Although Hunedoara County is the most urbanized county in Romania (75% of the population is urban - in 2011) it does not contain any city of more than 100,000 people. Also, following the de-industrialization after the communism fall, the major urban centres in the county, particularly Hunedoara and Petroșani, suffered significant population decline.

Municipalities
Brad - population: 13,909
Deva - capital city; population: 56,647
Hunedoara - population: 55,384
Lupeni - population: 21,986
Orăștie - population: 17,255
Petroșani - population: 34,331
Vulcan - population: 22,906
Towns
Aninoasa
Călan
Geoagiu
Hațeg
Petrila
Simeria
Uricani

Communes
Baia de Criș
Balșa
Bănița
Baru
Băcia
Băița
Bătrâna
Beriu
Blăjeni
Boșorod
Brănișca
Bretea Română
Buceș
Bucureșci
Bulzeștii de Sus
Bunila
Burjuc
Cerbăl
Certeju de Sus
Cârjiți
Crișcior
Densuș
Dobra
General Berthelot
Ghelari
Gurasada
Hărău
Ilia
Lăpugiu de Jos
Lelese
Lunca Cernii de Jos
Luncoiu de Jos
Mărtinești
Orăștioara de Sus
Pestișu Mic
Pui
Rapoltu Mare
Răchitova
Ribița
Râu de Mori
Romos
Sarmizegetusa
Sălașu de Sus
Sântămăria-Orlea
Șoimuș
Teliucu Inferior
Tomești
Toplița
Totești
Turdaș
Vața de Jos
Vălișoara
Vețel
Vorța
Zam

Historical county

Historically, the county was located in the central-western part of Greater Romania, in the southwestern part of Transylvania. It included a large part of the present Hunedoara County.

After the administrative unification law in 1925, the name of county remained as it was, but the territory was reorganized. It was bordered on the west by the counties of Severin and Arad, to the north by Turda County, to the east by the counties of Sibiu and Alba, and to the south by the counties of Gorj and Mehedinți.

Administration

The county originally consisted of ten districts (plăși):
Plasa Avram Iancu, headquartered at Avram Iancu
Plasa Brad, headquartered at Brad
Plasa Deva, headquartered at Deva
Plasa Geoagiu, headquartered at Geoagiu
Plasa Hațeg, headquartered at Hațeg
Plasa Hunedoara, headquartered at Hunedoara
Plasa Ilia, headquartered at Ilia
Plasa Orăștie, headquartered at Orăștie
Plasa Petroșani, headquartered at Petroșani
Plasa Pui, headquartered at Pui

Subsequently, two other districts were established:Plasa Dobra, headquartered at Dobra
Plasa Sarmizegetusa, headquartered at Sarmizegetusa

Population 
According to the census data of 1930, the county's population was 332,118, of which 82.0% were Romanians, 11.3% Hungarians, 2.5% Germans, 1.5% Romanies, 1.4% Jews, as well as other minorities. In the religious aspect, the population consisted of 64.2% Eastern Orthodox, 18.5% Greek Catholic, 9.1% Roman Catholic, 4.5% Reformed, as well as other minorities.

Urban population 
In 1930, the urban population of the county was 41,234, of which 52.8% were Romanians, 30.4% Hungarians, 6.7% Germans, 6.6% Jews, 1.6% Romanies, as well as other minorities. From the religious point of view, the urban population was made up of 42.0% Eastern Orthodox, 25.7% Roman Catholic, 10.5% Greek Catholic, 9.9% Reformed, 6.9% Jewish, 3.5% Lutheran, 1.0% Unitarian, as well as other minorities.

See also
Hunyad County of the Kingdom of Hungary

References

External links
 All about the Water Cave at Cioclovina

 
Counties of Romania
Geography of Transylvania
1925 establishments in Romania
1938 disestablishments in Romania
1940 establishments in Romania
1950 disestablishments in Romania
1968 establishments in Romania
States and territories established in 1925
States and territories disestablished in 1938
States and territories established in 1940
States and territories disestablished in 1950
States and territories established in 1968